Melvin Morse Swig (July 31, 1917 – May 14, 1993) was an American real estate developer and philanthropist. He was also owner of the National Hockey League's California Golden Seals and Cleveland Barons.

Early life and education
Swig was born to a Jewish family in Boston, a son of Benjamin Swig and grandson of politician and banker Simon Swig. He graduated from Brown University in 1939.

Career 
Swig was a real estate developer and philanthropist in San Francisco and New York. He was heir to the Fairmont Hotel chain, and former chairman of the Swig, Weiler & Dinner Development Company, of San Francisco and Manhattan, a family-owned real estate company with holdings including the Fairmont Hotels. Swig served in the United States Army in World War II and later moved to San Francisco in 1946.

In San Francisco, Swig was President of the Jewish Community Federation and the Jewish Community Endowment Fund. He established the Swig Judaic Studies Program at the University of San Francisco where he also served as chairman of the board.

Personal life
Swig was married four times. In 1939, he married Phyllis Diamond with whom he had two children; Steven and Judy. They divorced in 1951. Swig then married Marcia Hove and had twin sons: Robert and Kent. They divorced in 1965. His third wife was Dolores Cochrane who had two daughters from a previous marriage. They were married for seventeen years until her death from lung cancer. His fourth wife was Charlotte Mailliard (née Smith). After his death, she married George Pratt Shultz, who served as the U.S. Secretary of State from 1982 to 1989.

His children were all raised in the Jewish faith. His son Steven Swig, formally served as chairman of the board of the Swig Company in San Francisco, and is married to Mary Green, founder of Mary Green lingerie. His daughter Judy died of cancer in 1975 at the age of 26. His son Kent Swig, a real estate developer in New York, was married to and divorced from Elizabeth Macklowe, daughter of real estate developer Harry B. Macklowe. His son Robert Swig, a philanthropist in San Francisco, died of cancer in 2000 at the age of 39; Robert had three children with his wife Kim Baldwin Swig.

References

1917 births
1993 deaths
United States Army personnel of World War II
American people of Lithuanian-Jewish descent
American real estate businesspeople
Brown University alumni
Businesspeople from Boston
California Golden Seals owners
Cleveland Barons (NHL)
Jewish American philanthropists
University of San Francisco
20th-century American businesspeople
Jewish American sportspeople
20th-century American philanthropists
Swig family
20th-century American Jews